Nicholas Jon Yelloly (born 3 December 1990 in Stafford, England) is a British professional racing driver, and BMW Motorsport works driver. He is also currently a test and simulator driver for the Aston Martin F1 team.

Early career

Karting
Yelloly made his karting début in September 2005. After competing in Junior TKM Intermediate in 2006, Yelloly moved up to ICA in 2007, finishing 15th. Yelloly moved into the Super 1 National KF1 Championship in 2008, and finished in eighth position in the championship.

Formula Renault UK
Yelloly moved into the Formula Renault UK Winter Series in 2008 and finished fourteenth with points-scoring finishes in each of the four races with Fortec Competition. In 2009, Yelloly switched to the Hitech Junior Team, to contest a full season of Formula Renault UK. He had twelve point-scoring finishes on his way to nineteenth place in the championship and seventh in the Graduate Cup.

Yelloly remained in the series with the newly renamed Atech Grand Prix team. He improved to seventh place in the championship, with three podiums and a win at season finale in Brands Hatch.

GP3 Series
Yelloly continued his partnership with Atech CRS Grand Prix in 2011, stepping up to the GP3 Series alongside Marlon Stöckinger and Zoël Amberg. In a difficult season for the team, Yelloly finished 21st in the championship with seven points, courtesy of a strong showing at his home championship round held at Silverstone, but failing to score any points elsewhere. He was still the best-placed Atech CRS driver, as neither Stöckinger or Amberg registered a points finish all season.

Formula Renault 3.5
Yelloly made his Formula Renault 3.5 Series début at Silverstone for round seven of nine in the 2011 championship, driving for Pons Racing alongside Oliver Webb. After a difficult start, in which he was disqualified from his first race, he went on to secure three points finishes, including a podium in the final race at the Catalunya.

Yelloly signed for Comtec Racing for the 2012 season. He won the first race on the series calendar at Aragón, and picked up a second race win at the Nürburgring. He finished the season in fifth place overall, taking two further podium finishes at Spa-Francorchamps and Paul Ricard.

Return to GP3
In February 2013, Yelloly announced that he would return to the GP3 Series, racing for Carlin Motorsport for the upcoming season and finishing sixth overall, having scored four podiums. In 2014, he switched to Status Grand Prix. Though he finished second in the sprint race at the Yas Marina Circuit, Yelloly converted it into his first race win after race winner Patric Niederhauser was excluded from the results due to a breach in technical regulations, which elevated the Briton to sixth in the standings.

Sportscar career

Switch to GT Racing with Porsche 
In 2016 Yelloly made a switch to the Porsche Carrera Cup Germany series with the Project 1 Motorsport team, finishing the year as vice-champion of the rookie class and sixth place in the overall championship. He would also take part in the British Grand Prix supporting Porsche Supercup race at Silverstone.

For 2017 he returned to the series with the same team, this time winning three races and ending the year as runner-up along with two appearances in the Porsche Supercup.

After showing good pace in the national series, Yelloly would make the full time move in to the Porsche Supercup for 2018 with the Fach Auto Tech team. A season long battle with Michael Ammermüller and Thomas Preining saw the Brit take second in the championship, having secured wins at the support races for the Monaco and German Grand Prix.

BMW Motorsport works driver 
On 24 February 2019, BMW announced that Yelloly would be joining them as a works driver, taking part in his first race for the manufacturer in the China GT Championship in March. Driving for Fist Team AAI, the Briton took home five victories from ten races, thus earning himself the Chinese GT title.

ADAC GT Masters 
In 2020, Yelloly teamed up with Schubert Motorsport to drive alongside Henric Skoog for the majority of the ADAC GT Masters season. He finished 22nd in the standings with a lone victory at the Red Bull Ring, having missed two rounds during the campaign.

The Briton returned to the championship for the 2021 season, partnering Jesse Krohn in a Schubert-Motorsport-run BMW M6 GT3. With three podiums, including a second place during the season opener in Oschersleben, the pairing of Yelloly and Krohn ended the year eighth overall.

GT World Challenge 
Having taken part various rounds of the GT World Challenge Europe Endurance Cup from 2018 onwards, Yelloly competed in the series full-time with ROWE Racing during the 2022 campaign. After failing to score points during the first two events, Yelloly and his teammates Augusto Farfus and Nicky Catsburg proved themselves as contenders for the race win during the 24 Hours of Spa, where, having led during the intermediate classifications after six and twelve hours respectively, a puncture set the squad back to sixth by the end of the event. With more points coming at the final round in Barcelona, the Briton finished twelfth in the championship.

BMW Hypercar 
Yelloly moved into the IMSA SportsCar Championship for the 2023 season, becoming part of the BMW M Team RLL works team which entered a BMW M Hybrid V8 into the GTP category. Throughout the season opener at the 24 Hours of Daytona, technical issues would plague the outfit, which went on to finish 49th overall after an early hybrid system problem forced the Nr. 25 car to spend two and a half hours behind the pit wall. The team bounced back in Sebring, where, having engaged in battles with other cars in the category for the majority of the race, Yelloly profited from a collision between the #10 Acura and the pair of Porsche 963s ahead to take second place, BMW's first podium in the GTP era.

Formula One
In May 2019 Yelloly took part in the Young Driver Test at Circuit de Barcelona-Catalunya for Racing Point F1 Team. In December 2021, Yelloly took part in the post-season test at Yas Marina Circuit for Aston Martin.

Racing record

Karting career summary

Racing career summary

† As Yelloly was a guest driver, he was ineligible to score points.
* Season still in progress.

Complete Formula Renault UK results 
(key) (Races in bold indicate pole position) (Races in italics indicate fastest lap)

Complete GP3 Series results
(key) (Races in bold indicate pole position) (Races in italics indicate fastest lap)

Complete Formula Renault 3.5 Series results
(key) (Races in bold indicate pole position) (Races in italics indicate fastest lap)

Complete GP2 Series results
(key) (Races in bold indicate pole position) (Races in italics indicate fastest lap)

Complete Porsche Carrera Cup Germany results
(key) (Races in bold indicate pole position) (Races in italics indicate fastest lap)

Complete Porsche Supercup results
(key) (Races in bold indicate pole position) (Races in italics indicate fastest lap)

† As Yelloly was a guest driver, he was ineligible to score points.

Complete GT World Challenge Europe Endurance Cup results
(Races in bold indicate pole position) (Races in italics indicate fastest lap)

Complete China GT Championship results 
(key) (Races in bold indicate pole position) (Races in italics indicate fastest lap)

Complete ADAC GT Masters results
(key) (Races in bold indicate pole position) (Races in italics indicate fastest lap)

Complete IMSA SportsCar Championship results
(key) (Races in bold indicate pole position) (Races in italics indicate fastest lap)

* Season still in progress.

References

External links
 
 
 

1990 births
Living people
Sportspeople from Stafford
English racing drivers
British Formula Renault 2.0 drivers
Formula Renault Eurocup drivers
GP3 Series drivers
World Series Formula V8 3.5 drivers
GP2 Series drivers
Carlin racing drivers
Porsche Supercup drivers
Blancpain Endurance Series drivers
ADAC GT Masters drivers
WeatherTech SportsCar Championship drivers
Fortec Motorsport drivers
Pons Racing drivers
Comtec Racing drivers
Zeta Corse drivers
Status Grand Prix drivers
Hilmer Motorsport drivers
Charouz Racing System drivers
BMW M drivers
Nürburgring 24 Hours drivers
Rowe Racing drivers
Schnitzer Motorsport drivers
Rahal Letterman Lanigan Racing drivers
CRS Racing drivers
24H Series drivers
Boutsen Ginion Racing drivers
Porsche Carrera Cup Germany drivers